Young Hotel may refer to:
Alexander Young Building, Honolulu, Hawaii, United States, which operated as a hotel in the early 20th century
Fort Young Hotel, Roseau, Dominica
Young's Hotel (Boston), Massachusetts, United States, which operated from 1860 to 1927
Mississippi hotel operated by E. F. Young, Jr. (1898–1950)